Chrono Gatineau is an elite women's professional one-day time trial held in Canada and is currently rated by the Union Cycliste Internationale (UCI) as a 1.1 race. In the same week, the Grand Prix Cycliste de Gatineau is held.

Past winners

References

External links

 
Cycle races in Canada
Women's road bicycle races